Alice Gertrude Baldwin (1859 – 1943) was an African-American suffragist.

Family life 
Gertrude Baldwin was born in Baltimore, Maryland, in 1859 to Mary E. Baldwin and Peter L. Baldwin. She was the second of three children, with one older sister, Maria Louise Baldwin, and one younger brother, Louis F. Baldwin.

Education and career 
She grew up in Cambridge, Massachusetts, and attended New York University after attending teacher's college.

Suffrage work 
The Wilmington Equal Suffrage Club was formed March 19, 1914, and Alice Gertrude Baldwin was a member. She was a champion of woman suffrage and racial equality and worked for women's suffrage through the ratification of the Nineteenth Amendment.

References

1859 births
1943 deaths
African-American suffragists
American suffragists
Activists from Baltimore
People from Cambridge, Massachusetts
New York University alumni
20th-century African-American people
20th-century African-American women